The men's scratch competition at the 2020 UEC European Track Championships was held on 12 November 2020.

Results
First rider across the line without a net lap loss wins.

References

Men's scratch
European Track Championships – Men's scratch